Christine Powers is an American politician and librarian from Maine. A Democrat, Powers was a member of the Maine House of Representatives from December 2012 until December 2016. She has served on the Naples Board of Selectmen since 2002 and as Director of the Naples Public Library.

She replaced Richard Cebra as State Representative. Cebra subsequently was chosen Chairman of the Maine Republican Party.

References

Year of birth missing (living people)
Living people
People from Naples, Maine
Democratic Party members of the Maine House of Representatives
Maine local politicians
Women state legislators in Maine
American librarians
American women librarians
21st-century American politicians
21st-century American women politicians